Doğantepe can refer to:

 Doğantepe, Amasya
 Doğantepe, Çankırı